Marcus Sahlman (born 2 January 1985) is a retired Swedish footballer who played as goalkeeper.

Biography
Sahlman started his career with Halmstads BK, where he made his debut in 2004 in an away game against Malmö FF as forward rather than his usual position of goalkeeper. During 2006 season he played about half the league matches and Conny Johansson played the rest. After the club signed Magnus Bahne in 2007, Sahlman demanded to be put on the transfer list as he wanted to play first team football. He tried out for AGOVV Apeldoorn in the Netherlands but failed to secure a contract, he then went on loan to Trelleborgs FF for the rest of the season.

In 2008, in the absence of Magnus Bahne, he started all the league games until after the Euro 2008 championship and the return of Bahne, when he again became 2nd choice to Bahne.
On 2 July 2008 it was reported that he was in Norway trying out for Tippeligaen team Tromsø IL.
13 July 2008 Tromsø IL confirmed signing him in spite of competition from other teams, and on 14 July this was confirmed by Halmstads BK, he signed a 3-year contract starting 1 January 2009 with no compensation fee for Halmstads BK as he transferred under the Bosman ruling.

On 19 July 2008, Halmstads BK reported that he would go on loan rest of the season to Trelleborgs FF.

Sahlman missed out on most of the 2009 season due to injury.
Having started the 2010 season as second choice for Tromsø IL, he soon displaced Sead Ramović as first choice and was named man of the match by the supporters club after the match against VIF.  Tromsø IL have not lost a single match when Marcus Sahlman has played. This has led Tromsø IL's manager Per-Mathias Høgmo to openly speak out in the media and say that Sahlman should be Sweden's first choice goalkeeper.

Before the team's match against Rosenborg BK, Sahlman was the target of cruel taunts by their forward Rade Prica, where Prica claimed he "had never even heard of Sahlman, knew nothing of him where he had played or anything, and that he would score goals against him", Prica missed the game through injury.

Career statistics

References

External links
  
  
 

1985 births
Living people
Swedish footballers
Sweden under-21 international footballers
Sweden youth international footballers
Association football goalkeepers
Halmstads BK players
Trelleborgs FF players
IFK Norrköping players
Tromsø IL players
Allsvenskan players
Eliteserien players
Swedish expatriate footballers
Expatriate footballers in Norway
Swedish expatriate sportspeople in Norway
Sportspeople from Umeå